The Last Wish is the third published short story collection in Polish fantasy writer Andrzej Sapkowski's The Witcher series. Published by SuperNowa in 1993, it was preceded by 1992's Sword of Destiny, but is officially considered the first entry in the series and Sword of Destiny the second. The collection contains seven short stories interspersed with a continuing frame story: Geralt of Rivia, after having been injured in battle, rests in a temple. During that time he has flashbacks to recent events in his life, with each flashback forming a short story.

The Last Wish was first published in English on 7 June 2007 by Gollancz, and has also been translated into several other languages. In 2003, it won the Premio Ignotus for Best Anthology.

Plot

"The Witcher"

"The Voice of Reason" Part I - In Ellander's Temple of Melitele, a wounded Geralt is awakened from his slumber by Iola, a mute servant. The two make love, and fall asleep together, with Geralt dreaming of his fight with the monster who wounded him.

The King of Temeria, Foltest, has offered a reward to anyone who can lift the curse on his daughter, Adda (the result of an incestuous union with his late sister, also named Adda), who was born as a striga, and terrorizes the town every night. Foltest insists that his daughter not be harmed, but grants Geralt permission to kill her if Adda cannot be returned to human form. Geralt is unsure whether Adda can live as a "normal" human even if the curse is lifted.

Geralt prepares to spend the night at the old palace which houses the striga. Lord Ostrit, a magnate from Novigrad, tries to bribe Geralt into leaving. Ostrit wants to use the striga as proof of Foltest's inability to rule, convincing Temeria's people to support Novigrad's usurpation of Foltest. Geralt refuses and knocks out Ostrit to use him as bait.

Geralt fights and defeats the striga, despite the striga's resistance to silver. Unable to subdue the striga, Geralt seals himself into its crypt, forcing it to spend the night outside its lair, lifting the curse. In the morning, Geralt approaches the seemingly-restored Adda, but the girl attacks him and claws his neck. Geralt binds his wounds and faints, but regains consciousness in the temple, being told that Adda is being cared for by the King and Geralt has earned his reward.

"A Grain of Truth"

"The Voice of Reason" Part II - In the morning, priestess Nenneke awakens Geralt and Iola, and insists Geralt take part in a trance with Iola, which would show them Geralt's future. Geralt refuses.

While traveling through a forest, Geralt comes across the corpses of a man and a girl with strange wounds. Tracing the corpses' path, the Witcher arrives at a seemingly deserted mansion. He notices a woman in the forest nearby watching him, who runs away.

Geralt approaches the house and its owner, a bear-like beast named Nivellen, fails to scare him away. Nivellen allows Geralt to enter the house, which supernaturally obeys Nivellen's commands. Nivellen relates that, as the leader of his late father's gang of bandits, he raped a priestess of a temple, who cursed him to be a beast before killing herself. The priestess told him how to lift the curse, but he has forgotten her words, which were related to a kiss from a woman.

Returning to his family mansion, he invited the daughters of local villages to stay with him, rewarding their families from his treasury. None lifted his curse, and eventually he gave up, enjoying their company. Before departing, Geralt warns Nivellen that his newest relationship, named Vereena, may actually be a monster. Nivellen insists that he and Vereena are in love and is hesitant to break his curse, unsure if she would love him if he was an "ordinary" human. Geralt leaves. 

Along the road, Geralt has a realization and returns to the mansion. He meets Vereena, whom Geralt identifies as a bruxa, a vampire-like monster. She loves Nivellen, but has been killing and feeding on his other female companions, including the girl and her father that Geralt found in the woods. A fight ensues. The bruxa overwhelms Geralt, but Nivellen joins the fray and impales her on a pole. The bruxa confesses her love for Nivellen just before Geralt kills her. The confession breaks Nivellen's curse and he returns to normal. Geralt confides that the old stories about a kiss from a maiden lifting a curse like Nivellen's contain "a grain of truth": there has to be true love for the cure to work.

"The Lesser Evil"

"The Voice of Reason" Part III - Two knights of the Order of the White Rose, Count Falwick and Sir Tailles, arrive. They are ordered by the prince of Ellander to chase Geralt, "the Butcher of Blaviken", out of town. Geralt promises to leave in three days. Insulted, Tailles challenges Geralt to a duel, and the knights promise to return.

On the eve of a festival, Geralt rides into the town of Blaviken with a monster carcass in tow. He seeks out Caldemeyn, the town's alderman, to try to get a reward for killing the monster. Caldemeyn refuses, but one of his guards directs him to the town wizard. They head to the wizard's tower, and Geralt discovers the wizard is Stregobor, a mage he has met previously. Stregobor claims that a supposedly cursed woman wants to assassinate him, and wants Geralt's protection. Geralt refuses in disbelief and leaves.

Meanwhile, the assassin, named Renfri, has entered Blaviken along with her band of mercenaries. Geralt meets her in a local tavern, and she explains to Geralt and Caldemeyn that she is under protection from a king, which Caldemeyn confirms. That night, Geralt finds Renfri, who explains that Stregobor had previously tried to kill her for simple superstition, and encourages Geralt to kill Stregobor instead. Geralt refuses, and pleads with Renfri to forgive Stregobor to prove the superstition wrong. Renfri refuses, but implies she will leave town, before spending the night with Geralt.

In the morning, on the day of the festival, Geralt realizes that Renfri lied, and will massacre the people of Blaviken to draw Stregobor out of his tower. Geralt races to the marketplace and finds Renfri's mercenaries. Although they show no ill intent, Geralt attacks and kills them. When Renfri arrives, Geralt asks her to leave, but she refuses, so Geralt kills her. After the fight, Stregobor approaches Geralt, intent on performing an autopsy on Renfri's body to prove that the curse had physically affected her. Geralt stops him. Stregobor leaves, and the townsfolk, believing Geralt had just murdered a group of innocent men, hurl rocks at him. Caldemeyn stops the villagers, but demands Geralt leave Blaviken and never return. Geralt is now known as "the Butcher of Blaviken."

"A Question of Price"

"The Voice of Reason" Part IV - Geralt tells Iola his history as a Witcher.

Geralt is at the castle of Cintra, at the invitation of Queen Calanthe, attending the betrothal celebration for Crown Princess Pavetta. An uninvited knight with his face covered enters. He introduces himself as Urcheon of Erlenwald and claims Pavetta's hand in marriage, promised to him by her father Roegner, whose life Urcheon saved, before Pavetta's birth. Calanthe admits that he has a claim, but refuses to marry her daughter to a stranger. She orders him to remove his helmet and tricks him to make him think it's past midnight when he can remove the helmet. To everyone's shock, he has the face of a furry beast.

Geralt asks Pavetta whether she will agree to marry Urcheon. To the outrage of the other suitors, she accepts. The suitors attack Urcheon, but he is defended by Geralt and the King of Skellige, Eist Tuirseach, who loves Calanthe. The attack provokes Pavetta, revealing her latent magical powers, which threaten to destroy the castle until Geralt and Eist's druid councilor, Mousesack, subdue her. When the princess approaches Urcheon, he transforms into a man named Duny. Pavetta and Duny have been seeing each other secretly, and fallen in love. Calanthe agrees to their marriage, and, having been saved from Pavetta's magical outburst by Eist, agrees to marry him. Thanking Geralt for saving him, Duny offers him whatever he asks. Geralt invokes The Law of Surprise, the same law which gave Duny his claim to Pavetta's hand. Pavetta reveals that she is pregnant, so Geralt has a right to claim the child. He leaves, showing no sign of wanting to do so.

"The Edge of the World"

"The Voice of Reason" Part V - Dandelion, a poet and Geralt's friend, soon arrives. They discuss how the Witcher profession is losing profitability in modern times.

Geralt and Dandelion fail to find work in Upper Posada, Geralt dismissing the locals' tales of monsters as superstition. Moving on to Lower Posada, the village elder, Dhun, tells of a "deovel" whose mischief has become a problem, but under no circumstances should the creature be killed. In the countryside, Geralt and Dandelion confront the "deovel", which resembles a goat walking on two legs. Dandelion and the "devil" exchange insults, which provokes the devil to hurl iron balls at the pair, driving them away.

Back in the village, an ancient tome identifies the "devil" as a sylvan. The tome is read by a local witch and her young female companion, who was the one who forbade killing the sylvan. In a second confrontation, Geralt and Dandelion are knocked out and taken to the hideout of Aen Seidhe elves, with whom the sylvan, Torque, is taking refuge. 

The elves are angry with Geralt and Dandelion, but Torque reminds them that the agreement is that nobody would be killed. The elves break Dandelion's lute, angering him and Geralt. When the elves' leader, Filavandrel arrives, he orders them executed, as any witnesses threaten the elven hideout. Geralt bargains for Dandelion's life, claiming that Geralt wouldn't be missed but Dandelion would. Dandelion says he should be killed too, because he'd avenge Geralt. The legendary Queen of the Fields appears - she is the young witch from the village. While Filavandrel communicates with her, Torque frees Geralt and Dandelion. Filavandrel releases them, declaring that he and Geralt will meet again in battle. The elves give their lute to Dandelion as compensation.

The story ends with Geralt, Dandelion, and Torque sitting around a campfire, wondering where to go next.

"The Last Wish"  

"The Voice of Reason" Part VI - Geralt talks to Nenneke about Yennefer, a frequent visitor to the temple, and leaves a portion of his striga payment for her. Nenneke asks how Geralt first met Yennefer.

Dandelion and Geralt are fishing, when the former hauls up an ancient, sealed amphora. Ignoring Geralt's warnings, Dandelion opens the vase, releasing what he believes is a genie. He begins to recite three wishes, but the "genie" attacks him instead. Geralt banishes the creature with a local exorcism spell, and rushes Dandelion to the nearest city, Rinde, for medical aid. Visitors are not admitted after nightfall, forcing Geralt to spend the night in the guardhouse. Three other detainees - elves Chireadan, his cousin, Errdil, and the half-elf knight Vratimir - inform him that the city authorities have imposed heavy duties for spellcasting, and mages are boycotting Rinde. As a result, there is only one spellcaster in the city - the sorceress Yennefer of Vengerberg, given sanctuary by the Novigradian merchant-ambassador, Beau Berrant.

When dawn breaks, Geralt goes to Berrant's home, and meets Yennefer. She agrees to help Dandelion. Aside, Chireadan tells Geralt that Yennefer is not to be trusted. Yennefer heals Dandelion, but she demands to use Dandelion as bait to capture the genie. Geralt refuses to involve Dandelion, but she paralyzes Geralt with a spell. Before Geralt can break free, he passes out and wakes up in a cell with Chireadan.

Chireadan tells Geralt that Yennefer enchanted him into rampaging through the town, punishing anyone who had ever insulted her. Geralt and Chireadan are brought before the town's mayor and head priest, but the proceeding is interrupted by Dandelion, appearing through a magic portal and proclaiming Geralt's innocence. There is chaos outside: Yennefer has lured the genie to the town, and is trying to capture it and harness its powers. The genie is stronger than expected, and she is losing hold of it, threatening to destroy the town. Geralt tries to pull Yennefer to safety, but she insists on binding the genie, although she does offer to get Geralt to safety. After a fight, Geralt realizes that the genie is bound to him, who last held the seal to its urn. It granted his first wish by obeying the "exorcism" (which literally translated as an instruction to "fuck off"), granted his second by killing one of the guards beating him in prison, and is now awaiting his third and last wish. Geralt uses his wish in an unknown way that manages to save Yennefer, and the genie escapes.

Under the rubble of the inn, Yennefer finds herself in Geralt's arms, and the two make love.

"The Voice of Reason"

Geralt and Dandelion leave the temple, but are stopped by Falwick, Tailles and a company of soldiers. They are accompanied by Dennis Cranmer, the dwarf captain of the prince's guard. The knights outline an unwinnable situation to Geralt, in which he must accept Tailles' earlier challenge but not harm Tailles, or else he'll be killed. Geralt accepts, but avoids punishment by parrying his sword so that Tailles's own blade bashes him in the face. Dennis accepts the loophole and permits Geralt to leave, hoping to meet Geralt again. Falwick is outraged, but Geralt asks if the knight is willing to accept a challenge from Geralt. Falwick falls silent, and Geralt congratulates him for listening to "the voice of reason."

Before Geralt leaves, he accidentally touches Iola's hand, inducing the trance. Geralt, Iola, and Nenneke see a bloody vision of Geralt's future. Geralt dismisses the vision, claiming to have seen it before, and says goodbye to Nenneke.

Production
The first collection of Andrzej Sapkowski's short stories was simply titled The Witcher and published by Reporter in 1990. SuperNowa acquired the publishing rights to the series that same year and published their first entry, Sword of Destiny, in 1992. In 1993, they published The Last Wish to replace Reporter's collection as the first book in their official order. It includes the same stories, except "The Road with No Return", with the addition of "The Voice of Reason", "A Question of Price", and "The Last Wish".

The Last Wish contains many references to classic fairy tales. "The Witcher" (1986) was conceived as a retelling of a Polish fairy tale where a princess turned into a monster as punishment for the incest of her parents. "A Question of Price" (and later "Sword of Destiny") were based on the universally known fairy tale in which a monster or sorcerer saves somebody's life and then demands payment. The 'Law of Surprise' in the story mirrors a similar 'law' established in the fairy tale Rumpelstiltskin, as popularized by the Brothers Grimm in 1812. Similarly, the story "A Grain of Truth" features a man who has been turned into a beast through witchcraft, who is eventually turned back into a man through finding 'true love' - as in the classic story Beauty and the Beast. Most notably, in the story "A Lesser Evil", the character Shrike is introduced as a princess who was forced to flee her kingdom with the assistance of a huntsman, due to an evil stepmother. She later meets a band of seven dwarves and convinces them that highway robbery is more profitable than mining. This seems to be an allusion to the fairy tale character Snow White.

Fictional chronology
The stories in these books take place after the short story "The Road with No Return". The novel Season of Storms takes place between "The Last Wish" and "A Question of Price".

"A Grain of Truth"
"The Lesser Evil"
"The Edge of the World"
"The Last Wish"
"A Question of Price"
"The Witcher"
"The Voice of Reason"

Audio book 
A Polish-language audio book based on The Last Wish and The Sword of Destiny was released in 2011 by Fonopolis and audioteka.pl. The Last Wish, lasting about 12 hours, was voiced by 52 actors, including Krzysztof Banaszyk as Geralt, Anna Dereszowska as Yennefer, Sławomir Pacek as Dandelion, and Krzysztof Gosztyła as narrator.

Reception
"The Lesser Evil" story included in the collection earned Sapkowski the Janusz A. Zajdel Award in 1990. The Last Wish won the 2003 Premio Ignotus for Best Anthology. In 2011, Polish Prime Minister Donald Tusk gave U.S. President Barack Obama diplomatic presents, as is custom, on his visit to Poland. One of these was a signed copy of The Last Wish. The English edition charted on The New York Times Best Seller list in June 2015, coinciding with the release of The Witcher 3: Wild Hunt video game.

Rob H. Bedford of SFF World praised the interconnected "story within a story" framework of the collection as a great introduction to Geralt and "the fantastical world in which he resides, only hinting at the depth of the world and intrigue of the character." Although the magical elements are familiar, he found them refreshing because they were "reinterpreted through the myths and folklore of Sapkowski's Polish/Slavic background".

Adaptations
Several short stories from The Last Wish have been adapted for television and video games.

Elements of "The Voice of Reason" were used for The Hexer episodes "Human – First Meeting", "Crossroads" and "The Temple of Melitele".
"The Witcher" was adapted for:
The opening cinematic of The Witcher video game;
The episode "Crossroads" of The Hexer; and
The episode "Betrayer Moon" (Season 1, Episode 3) of The Witcher television series
A comic book series published by Dark Horse, set in the video game continuity, "Curse of the Crows" adapts the story in the flashbacks and the main plot draws some inspiration from the story as well;
"The Lesser Evil" was adapted for:
The Hexer episode of the same name, and other elements of the story were used in the episodes "Dandelion" and "Human-First Meeting";
The episode "The End's Beginning" (Season 1, Episode 1) of The Witcher series;
"A Question of Price" was adapted for
The Hexer episode "Calanthe"; and
elements were used for the episode "Of Banquets, Bastards and Burials" (Season 1, Episode 4) of The Witcher series;
"The Edge of the World" was adapted for:
The Hexer episode "The Valley of Flowers"; and
The episode "Four Marks" (Season 1, Episode 2) of The Witcher series;
"The Last Wish"
A side quest of the same name in the video game The Witcher 3: Wild Hunt serves as a direct continuation for the story;
The episode "Bottled Appetites" (Season 1, Episode 5) of The Witcher series.
"A Grain of Truth" was adapted into Season 2, Episode 1 of "The Witcher"

Notes

References

External links

Review by Fantasy Book Critic
Review by OF Blog of the Fallen
Review by The Wertzone
 Review of the English edition by Asthner i Falka, Biblioteka Światów
 Review of the Polish edition by Michał BAZYL Krupko, Biblioteka Światów

1993 short story collections
Fantasy short story collections
The Witcher
Polish short story collections
Polish fantasy